The 1991 Kalabahi earthquakes struck the sea adjacent to Timor on July 4, leaving twenty three people dead and injuring 181. The two quakes, which took place two-and-a-half seconds apart, measured 6.9 on the  scale.

Geography 

Damage and casualties 
The earthquake struck Timor with a magnitude of 6.9. The earthquake caused 3 fatalities on Alor alone, and 181 injuries. 1,150 buildings were destroyed and at least 5,400 civilians were left homeless.

Damage by the epicenter was estimated at 1991 USD $7,700,000.

References

External links 

Kalabahi Earthquakes, 1991
Kalabahi Earthquakes, 1991
Earthquakes in Indonesia
1991 in Indonesia
July 1991 events in Asia
Earthquake clusters, swarms, and sequences
1991 disasters in Indonesia